Bugbrooke St Michaels Football Club is an English football club based in Bugbrooke, Northamptonshire.

History

The club was established in 1929 and named after the village church. They joined the Central Northamptonshire Combination in 1952, and won the league without losing a match in 1968–69. They retained the title the following season and were champions again in 1971–72. They were relegated to Division One at the end of the 1974–75, but returned to the Premier Division in 1976, going on to be champions again in 1976–77 and 1985–86.

After finishing third in 1986–87, they moved up to Division One of the United Counties League. They won the Northamptonshire Junior Cup in 1989–90. After becoming Division One champions in 1998–99, the club were promoted to the Premier Division. However, they were relegated back to Division One at the end of the 2001–02 season after finishing second-from-bottom in the Premier Division. The club won the Northamptonshire Junior Cup again in 2011–12. In 2021 they were promoted to the Premier Division South based on their results in the abandoned 2019–20 and 2020–21 seasons.

Ground
The club play Birds Close, located on the southern edge of the village next to the rugby club.

Honours
United Counties League
Division One champions 1998–99
Central Northamptonshire Combination
Champions 1968–69, 1969–70, 1971–72, 1976–77, 1985–86
Northamptonshire Junior Cup
Winners 1989–90, 2011–12

Records
Best FA Cup performance: First qualifying round, 2012–13
Best FA Vase performance: Second round, 2009–10
Record attendance: 1,156
Most appearances: Jimmy Nord
Most goals: Vince Thomas

References

External links

Football clubs in England
Football clubs in Northamptonshire
1929 establishments in England
Association football clubs established in 1929
Northamptonshire Combination Football League
United Counties League